Mazada is a rural locality (a selo) and the administrative center of Mazadinsky Selsoviet, Tlyaratinsky District, Republic of Dagestan, Russia. The population was 195 as of 2010.

Geography 
Mazada is located 25 km north of Tlyarata (the district's administrative centre) by road. Rosta is the nearest rural locality.

References 

Rural localities in Tlyaratinsky District